New Jersey: The Movie is a 2009 American documentary film written and directed by Steve Chernoski. The film examines the cultural divide that exists in the state of New Jersey between North and South.

It was released on  DVD in February 2010.

The film was produced by Alena Kruchkova and edited by Andrei Litvinov.

See also

Central Jersey

References

External links
Official Website
 
The Signal of TCNJ Review

2009 films
American documentary films
New Jersey culture
Films shot in New Jersey
2009 documentary films
2000s English-language films
2000s American films